The 2004 Tour of Britain was the first edition of the latest version of the Tour of Britain. It took place over five days in early September 2004, organised by SweetSpot in collaboration with British Cycling, and was the first Tour of Britain to be held since 1999. It was designated a 2.3 category race on the Union Cycliste Internationale (UCI) calendar.

The tour climaxed with a  criterium in London, where an estimated 100,000 spectators saw a long break by Bradley Wiggins last until the penultimate lap, before Enrico Degano of Team Barloworld took the sprint on the line. The Colombian Mauricio Ardila, of Chocolade Jacques, won the race overall.

Stages

Final general classification

References

2004 in British sport
Britain
2004